This is a list of Nine Network's past and present presenters and the programs they appear on, in alphabetical order by their last name.

Presenters

See also
 Nine News for lists of reporters for each state's bulletins.

Australian television-related lists